Alonzo Patricio Zúñiga Delgado (born 23 March 1980) is a Chilean former footballer who mainly played as a midfielder.

International career
In 1997, Zúñiga represented Chile at under-17 level in both the South American Championship and the FIFA World. At under-20 level, he took part of the squad in both the 1999 South American Championship and the 1998 L'Alcúdia Tournament. Chile U20 was the champion of L'Alcúdia Tournament.

Honours
Colo-Colo
 Primera División de Chile (2): 1998, 2002 Clausura

Santiago Wanderers
 Primera División de Chile (1): 2001

Vaduz
 Liechtenstein Football Cup (1): 2004–05

Chile U20
 L'Alcúdia International Football Tournament (1): 1998

References

External links
 
 Alonzo Zúñiga at Football Lineups
 
 Alonzo Zúñiga at MemoriaWanderers 

1980 births
Living people
Footballers from Santiago
Chilean footballers
Chilean expatriate footballers
Chile youth international footballers
Chile under-20 international footballers
Colo-Colo footballers
Santiago Wanderers footballers
Puerto Montt footballers
Club Atlético Fénix players
Deportes Concepción (Chile) footballers
FC Vaduz players
Universidad de Chile footballers
C.D. Antofagasta footballers
Cobreloa footballers
Santiago Morning footballers
Unión Temuco footballers
San Antonio Unido footballers
Chilean Primera División players
Primera B de Chile players
Uruguayan Primera División players
Swiss Challenge League players
Tercera División de Chile players
Chilean expatriate sportspeople in Uruguay
Chilean expatriate sportspeople in Liechtenstein
Chilean expatriate sportspeople in Switzerland 
Expatriate footballers in Uruguay
Expatriate footballers in Liechtenstein
Expatriate footballers in Switzerland 
Association football defenders
Association football midfielders